Leucocelis albosticta is a species of chafer beetles belonging to the family Scarabaeidae.

Description
Pronotum is reddish, while elytra are shining green with small white spots.

Distribution
This species has an Afrotropical distribution range (East Africa, Uganda, Tanzania).

References

Cetoniinae
Beetles described in 1895
Taxa named by Hermann Julius Kolbe